Sthenognatha cinda is a moth in the family Erebidae. It was described by William Schaus in 1938. It is found on Cuba.

References

Moths described in 1938
Sthenognatha
Endemic fauna of Cuba